Otrokovice railway station is a railway station in Otrokovice in the Czech Republic. It is a mainline railway station situated on an international corridor linking Austria and Slovakia with Poland, and serves the wider Zlín metropolitan area; the more centrally located Zlín střed railway station is located on an unelectrified line, and is served almost entirely by local trains. Otrokovice station is served by trains operated by Czech Railways, Arriva and Leo Express.

The station is situated adjacent to a Continental Tyres factory. It is connected to Zlín's trolleybus network.

Services

References

External links

 Rail CC-Otrokovice railway station

Railway stations in Zlín Region
19th-century establishments in Bohemia
Zlín District
Railway stations in the Czech Republic opened in 1841